Desert Gold is a 1936 American Western film directed by James P. Hogan, starring Buster Crabbe and Marsha Hunt, based on a Zane Grey novel and released by Paramount Pictures. The film's sets were designed by David S. Garber, overseen by Hans Dreier.

The film is also known as Desert Storm (American reissue title).

Cast 
 Buster Crabbe as Chief Moya
 Robert Cummings as Fordyce "Ford" Mortimer
 Marsha Hunt as Judith "Judy" Belding
 Tom Keene as Randolph Gale
 Leif Erickson as Glenn Kasedon
 Monte Blue as Chetley "Chet" Kasedon
 Raymond Hatton as Doc Belding
 Walter Miller as Henchman Hank Ladd
 Frank Mayo as Henchman Bert Lash

Reception
The Los Angeles Times said "it is all well done."

References

External links 
 
 
 

1936 films
1936 Western (genre) films
1936 romantic drama films
American Western (genre) films
American action drama films
American black-and-white films
American romantic drama films
1930s English-language films
Films based on American novels
Films based on works by Zane Grey
Films directed by James Patrick Hogan
Paramount Pictures films
1930s American films